The American Society of Botanical Artists (ASBA) is the principal United States society for those who practice and appreciate contemporary botanical art. Since its founding by Diane Bouchier in 1994, ASBA has grown to nearly 2000 individual members in 39 countries and  more than 40 institutional members from around the world.

ASBA members include botanical artists at all levels from beginners to masters, instructors, collectors, curators, botanical gardens, museums, academic institutions, and libraries.

Definition 
The Society defines "botanical art" as
 Having an aesthetic appeal, exhibiting the elements and principles of artistic design
 Made to intent of elicit an intellectual or emotional response
 To scale (actual size or scaled enlargement or reduction)
 Free of animals except those that are interdependent with the plant and depicted subordinated to the plant
 Free of backgrounds except for solid colors, textured substrates, or the natural habitat of the plant portrayed subordinate to the plant

Journals 
ASBA publishes The Botanical Artist quarterly journal.

Exhibitions and awards 
The ASBA organizes an Annual International Juried Exhibition in conjunction with the Horticultural Society of New York.  At this annual exhibition, it awards the Diana Bouchier Artist Award for Excellence in Botanical Art, the James White Service Award for Dedication to Botanical Art, and the Botanical Illustrator Award for Excellence in Scientific Botanical Art.
 2010 through 2014 - 13th, 14th, 15th, 16th, 17th International ASBA Botanical Art Exhibition at the Horticultural Society of New York
 2015 through 2017 - 18th, 19th, 20th Annual International Exhibit at The New York Design Center
 Fall 2018 - 21st Annual International Exhibit at Wave Hill
 Fall 2019 - 22nd Annual International Exhibit at Marin Art & Garden Center, Ross, CA
 Fall 2020 - 23rd Annual International Exhibit at Wave Hill

References

External links 
Official site

Arts organizations based in the United States
Scientific societies based in the United States
Botanical art
Botanical societies
Arts organizations established in 1994
Scientific organizations established in 1994
1994 establishments in the United States